Butler County (county code BU) is a county in the southern portion of the U.S. state of Kansas and is the largest county in the state by total area. As of the 2020 census, the county population was 67,380. Its county seat is El Dorado and its most populous city is Andover.

History

Early history

For many millennia, the Great Plains of North America was inhabited by nomadic Native Americans. From the 16th century to 18th century, the Kingdom of France claimed ownership of large parts of North America. In 1762, after the French and Indian War, France secretly ceded New France to Spain, per the Treaty of Fontainebleau. In 1802, Spain returned most of the land to France, but keeping title to about 7,500 square miles.

In 1803, most of the land for modern day Kansas was acquired by the United States from France as part of the 828,000 square mile Louisiana Purchase for 2.83 cents per acre. In 1848, after the Mexican–American War, the Treaty of Guadalupe Hidalgo with Spain brought into the United States all or part of land for ten future states, including southwest Kansas. In 1854, the Kansas Territory was organized, then in 1861 Kansas became the 34th U.S. state.

19th century
In 1855, Butler County was founded. It was named in honor of a U.S. Senator from South Carolina, Andrew Butler (1796-1857), who was one of the authors of the Kansas-Nebraska Act of 1854 and a strong advocate of Kansas becoming a slave state.

In 1877, the Florence, El Dorado, and Walnut Valley Railroad Company built a branch line from Florence to El Dorado, in 1881 it was extended to Douglass, and later to Arkansas City.  The line was leased and operated by the Atchison, Topeka and Santa Fe Railway. The line from Florence to El Dorado was abandoned in 1942.  The original branch line connected Florence, Burns, De Graff, El Dorado, Augusta, Douglass, Rock, Akron, Winfield, Arkansas City.

In 1887, the Chicago, Kansas and Nebraska Railway built a branch line north–south from Herington to Caldwell.  This branch line connected Herington, Lost Springs, Lincolnville, Antelope, Marion, Aulne, Peabody, Elbing, Whitewater, Furley, Kechi, Wichita, Peck, Corbin, Wellington, Caldwell. By 1893, this branch line was incrementally built to Fort Worth, Texas. This line is called the "OKT". The Chicago, Kansas and Nebraska Railway was foreclosed in 1891 and was taken over by Chicago, Rock Island and Pacific Railway, which shut down in 1980 and reorganized as Oklahoma, Kansas and Texas Railroad, merged in 1988 with Missouri Pacific Railroad, and finally merged in 1997 with Union Pacific Railroad. Most locals still refer to this railroad as the "Rock Island".

21st century
In 2010, the Keystone-Cushing Pipeline (Phase II) was constructed north to south through Butler County (near Potwin, Towanda, Augusta, Douglass), with much controversy over tax exemption and environmental concerns (if a leak ever occurs).  A pumping station named Burns was built 2 miles north of Potwin, and new power lines were built from a high-voltage line 0.3 mile east of De Graff.

In an unusual technical glitch, a farmstead about 4 miles northeast of Potwin became the default site of 600 million IP addresses (due to their lack of fine granularity) when the Massachusetts-based digital mapping company MaxMind changed the putative geographic center of the contiguous United States from 39.8333333,-98.585522 to 38.0000,-97.0000.

Geography
It is the largest county by area in Kansas.

Adjacent counties

 Chase County (northeast)
 Greenwood County (east)
 Elk County (southeast)
 Cowley County (south)
 Sumner County (southwest)
 Harvey County (west)
 Sedgwick County (west)
 Marion County (northwest)

Major highways
Sources: National Atlas, U.S. Census Bureau
 Interstate 35
 U.S. Route 54
 U.S. Route 77
 Kansas Highway 96
 Kansas Highway 177
 Kansas Highway 196
 Kansas Highway 254

Demographics

Butler County is part of the Wichita, KS Metropolitan Statistical Area.

2000 census
As of the census of 2000, 59,482 people, 21,527 households, and 16,059 families resided in the county. There were 23,176 housing units at an average density of 16 per square mile (6/km2). The county's racial makeup was 94.94% White, 1.38% Black or African American, 0.91% Native American, 0.40% Asian, 0.03% Pacific Islander, 0.66% from other races, and 1.69% two or more races. Hispanic or Latino of any race were 2.25% of the population.

There were 21,527 households, of which 37.90% had children under the age of 18 living with them, 62.60% were married couples living together, 8.30% had a female householder with no husband present, and 25.40% were non-families. 21.90% of all households were made up of individuals, and 9.40% had someone living alone who was 65 years of age or older. The average household size was 2.67 and the average family size was 3.13.

In the county, the population was spread out, with 28.60% under the age of 18, 8.30% from 18 to 24, 28.80% from 25 to 44, 21.70% from 45 to 64, and 12.60% who were 65 years of age or older.  The median age was 36 years. For every 100 females, there were 100.90 males. For every 100 females age 18 and over, there were 98.80 males.

The county's median household income was $45,474, and the median family income was $53,632. Males had a median income of $38,675 versus $26,109 for females. The county's per capita income was $20,150. About 5.40% of families and 7.30% of the population were below the poverty line, including 9.00% of those under age 18 and 6.40% of those age 65 or over.

Government

Presidential elections

Like of most of Kansas’ counties, Butler county is solidly Republican. In 2008, John McCain carried the county by a nearly two-to-one margin over Barack Obama. Since 1992, no Democratic candidate has received so much as forty percent of the county's vote. The last Democratic candidate to carry the county was Jimmy Carter in 1976.

Laws
Butler County was a prohibition, or "dry", county until the Kansas Constitution was amended in 1986 and voters approved the sale of alcoholic liquor by the individual drink with a 30% food sales requirement.

Education

College
 Butler County Community College in El Dorado

Unified school districts
 Bluestem USD 205
 Remington USD 206
 Circle USD 375
 Andover USD 385
 Rose Hill USD 394
 Douglass USD 396
 Augusta USD 402
 El Dorado USD 490
 Flinthills USD 492

School district office in neighboring county
 Peabody–Burns USD 398
 Central USD 462

Private schools
 Berean Academy in Elbing

Communities

Cities

 Andover
 Augusta
 Benton
 Cassoday
 Douglass
 Elbing
 El Dorado
 Latham
 Leon
 Potwin
 Rose Hill
 Towanda
 Whitewater

Unincorporated communities
† means a Census-Designated Place (CDP) by the United States Census Bureau.

 Beaumont†
 Bois d'Arc
 Brainerd
 De Graff
 Gordon
 Haverhill
 Keighley
 Lorena
 Midian
 Pontiac
 Rosalia†

Ghost towns

 Aikman
 Alki
 Amador
 Browntown
 Chelsea (now lies under El Dorado Lake)
 Durachen
 Frazier
 Lorena
 Magna City
 Midian
 Oil Hill
 Oil Valley
 Ophir
 Plum Grove
 Providence
 Ramsey
 Salter
 Vanora
 Wingate

Townships
Butler County is divided into twenty-nine townships. The cities of Augusta and El Dorado are considered governmentally independent and are excluded from the census figures for the townships. In the following table, the population center is the largest city (or cities) included in that township's population total, if it is of a significant size.

See also
 National Register of Historic Places listings in Butler County, Kansas

References

Further reading

 History of Butler County, Kansas; Vol P Mooney; Standard Publishing; 869 pages; 1916.
 An Illustrated Hand Book, Compiled from the Official Statistics, Descriptive of Butler County, Kansas; 66 pages; T.B. Murdock; 1887.
 Standard Atlas of Butler County, Kansas; Geo. A. Ogle & Co; 69 pages; 1905.
 Standard Atlas of Butler County, Kansas; Walter F. McGinnis & I.C. Thomas; 59 pages; 1885.

External links

County
 
 Butler County - Directory of Public Officials
Historical
 Butler County GenWeb
 Kansas State Historical Society
Maps
 Butler County Maps: Current, Historic, KDOT
 Kansas Highway Maps: Current, Historic, KDOT
 Kansas Railroad Maps: Current, 1996, 1915, KDOT and Kansas Historical Society

 
Kansas counties
1855 establishments in Kansas Territory
Wichita, KS Metropolitan Statistical Area